Kim Milyoner Olmak İster? (English translation: Who Wants to Be a Millionaire?) is a Turkish game show based on the original British format of Who Wants to Be a Millionaire?. The program was broadcast from  August 2, 2011.

The main goal of the game is to win ₺1,000,000 by answering 12 multiple-choice questions correctly. There are four lifelines: Ask the Audience, Phone a Friend, 50/50 and Double Dip. If contestant answers 1st or 2nd question incorrectly, the contestant walks away with absolutely nothing. During the game, the contestant can walk away with the money they earned in the game, thus ending the game. The program was broadcast from August 2011 and it is shown on ATV.

This version adopts the clock format from the US version. The first two questions each have a 15-second time-limit and contestants then have a 45-second time-limit for each of the next five questions. After answering 7th question correctly, the clock is removed and there is no time limit to answer the last five questions. If the contestant fails to give a final answer when the time expires, it will be treated as if a wrong answer was given by the contestant.

Kim Milyoner Olmak İster payout structure

Lifelines
Using a lifeline temporarily pauses the question's timer.
Ask the Audience (Seyirciye Sorma): The contestant asks the studio audience which answer they believe is correct. Members of the studio audience indicate their choices using an audience response system and audience have 10 seconds to do. The results are immediately displayed on the contestant's and host's screens. This is a popular lifeline, known for its near-perfect accuracy. This lifeline was temporarily suspended by the COVID-19 pandemic.
Phone a Friend (Telefon): The contestant selects one of their three friends to call. The contestants have 30 seconds to read the question and the options to their friend. Also, friends have 30 seconds to answer the question on the phone given to them by contestants.
50/50 (Yarı yarıya): Computer eliminates two wrong answers randomly.
Double Dip (Çift Yanıt): The contestant can give two answers for a question; but, contestants can't walk away or use any other lifelines after selecting it. This lifeline is available to the contestant after answering 7th question correctly. If the contestant had used 50/50 and then decides to use Double Dip, the contestant is guaranteed to get the correct answer for the question.
Ask the Expert (Uzman yardımı). The contestant turns to an invited expert (Arda Ayten) who can help answer the question. The lifeline replaced the "Ask the Audience" in 2020.

References

Who Wants to Be a Millionaire?
Turkish game shows
2011 Turkish television series debuts
ATV (Turkey) original programming